The Cooperative Business Bank Building is a building designed in 1921 by architect Ivan Vurnik and his wife Helena Vurnik in the so-called Slovene "National Style" using decorative ornaments in the colors of Slovene tricolor and was inspired by the Vienna Secession style of architecture (a type of Art Nouveau). It is located on Miklosich Street, Ljubljana, capital city of Slovenia, and has been called "the most beautiful building" in Ljubljana.

Architecture
The facade is richly decorated and has five floors and in each one five windows looking toward Miklosich Street. 
The interior features wall paintings and a glass ceiling with decorative multicolored bottles built into it. The staircase hall on the first and second floor have stained glass windows, depicting geometric motifs.

References

External links 
 An interactive 360° picture of the building, photographed and made interactive in 2008 by Boštjan Burger

Commercial buildings completed in 1921
Art Nouveau architecture in Ljubljana
Art Nouveau commercial buildings
Buildings and structures in Ljubljana
20th-century architecture in Slovenia